A parasite is an organism that has sustained contact with another organism to the detriment of the host organism.

Parasite, parasitism, or parasitic may also refer to:

Film and television
The Parasite (1925 film), an American silent film
Parasite (1982 film), an American science fiction horror film
Parasite (2019 film), a South Korean black comedy thriller film
"Parasite" (Heroes), an episode of Heroes
"Parasite", an episode of Teen Titans Go!

Literature 
The Parasite, an 1894 novelette by Sir Arthur Conan Doyle
The Parasites, a 1949 novel by Daphne Du Maurier
Parasite (comics), several supervillains in DC Comics
Parasite (Grant novel), a 2013 novel by Mira Grant
Parasite (Mortimore novel), a 1994 Doctor Who novel by Jim Mortimore

Music
Parasite (band), a band from Surrey, England
Parasites (band), an American pop-punk band

Albums
Parasite (Fractal Glider album) (2002)
Parasite!, a 2006 EP by Mustasch
Parasite (See You Next Tuesday album) (2007)
Parasite, a 2017 EP by The Coathangers

Songs
"Parasite" (song), a 1974 song by Kiss from Hotter Than Hell
"Parasite", a song by Disturbed from Indestructible
"Parasite", a song by Nick Drake from Pink Moon
"Parasites", a song by Ugly Casanova from Sharpen Your Teeth
"Parasite", a song by Volbeat from Rewind, Replay, Rebound
"Parasites", a song by Daniel Kahn & the Painted Bird from Partisans and Parasites

Other uses
Parasite (journal), a scientific journal on parasitology
Parasitism (social offense), a charge that a group or class in society is detrimental to the whole
An outdated term for epenthesis.

See also
Para Site, an independent non-profit arts organisation in Hong Kong
Parasyte, a 1989 manga
Parasitic plants, plants that grow on other plants
Parasitus, a stock character in ancient Roman comedy 
Paraziții, a Romanian hip hop band
Parisite, a rare mineral
Social parasitism (disambiguation)